Helenoscoparia lucidalis is a moth in the family Crambidae. It was described by Francis Walker in John Charles Melliss's 1875 book. It is found on Saint Helena.

References

Moths described in 1875
Scopariinae